Triantafyllia Manolioudaki (born 19 March 1986) is a Greek water polo player, captain of the Greek powerhouse Olympiacos and key member of the Greece women's national water polo team.

Manolioudaki took part with the Greece national team that brought home the Water polo at the 2011 World Aquatics Championships – Women's tournament#Final ranking gold medal at the 2011 World Aquatics Championships which took place in Shanghai in July 2011.

Club career
 2007– Olympiacos Piraeus

Club honours

Olympiacos
 1 LEN Euro League
 2015
 1 LEN Trophy
 2014
 4 Greek Championships
 2009, 2011, 2014, 2015

National team honours
  Gold medal World Championship (1): 2011
  Silver medals European Championship (2): 2010, 2012
  Bronze medals World League (2):''' 2010, 2012

See also
 List of world champions in women's water polo
 List of World Aquatics Championships medalists in water polo

References

External links
 
 Triantafyllia Manolioudaki profile
 Interview with Triantafyllia Manolioudaki (in Greek), www.redplanet.gr, April 26, 2015

1986 births
Living people
Olympiacos Women's Water Polo Team players
Greek female water polo players
World Aquatics Championships medalists in water polo
Water polo players from Chania